Self-Portrait or Self-Portrait with an Architectural Background is a c.1639 oil on panel self-portrait by Rembrandt, now in the Louvre in Paris. It was bought by the art dealer Alexandre Joseph Paillet in London in 1785 for the collection of Louis XVI.

Sources
http://cartelfr.louvre.fr/cartelfr/visite?srv=car_not_frame&idNotice=25574

Paintings in the Louvre by Dutch, Flemish and German artists
Louvre
1639 paintings
17th-century portraits
Portraits of men